Djon Mundine  (born 1951) is an Aboriginal Australian curator, writer, artist and activist.

Early life
Djon was born in  Grafton, New South Wales in 1941. He is one of 11 children born to Roy Mundine and Olive Bridgette Mundine (nee Donovan). His siblings include Roy, Anne, Olive, Kaye, Charles, Peter, Philip, Warren Mundine, James and Graeme. He is a Wehbal man from the West Bundjalung nation, from the Northern Rivers of New South Wales. He is also a descendant of the Gumbaynggirr, Yuin people.

Mundine spent his early life growing up in South Grafton. In 1963, his family settled in the western Sydney suburb of Auburn. Mundine went to the Catholic Benedict Marist Brothers College and went onto commence study at Macquarie University.

Career 
Mundine is a curator, writer, artist and activist and is celebrated as a foundational figure in the criticism and exhibition of contemporary Aboriginal Australian art.
 
Mundine has held many senior curatorial positions in both national and international institutions, some of which include the National Museum of Australia, the Museum of Contemporary Art, Art Gallery of New South Wales and Campbelltown Art Centre.

Between the years 1979 and 1995, Mundine was the Art Advisor at Milingimbi and curator at Bula-bula Arts in Ramingining, Arnhem Land for sixteen years. Mundine was the concept artist and producer of the ‘Aboriginal Memorial’. The Aboriginal Memorial is a work of contemporary Indigenous Australian art from the late 1980s, and comprises 200 decorated hollow log coffins. The work was realised by 43 artists from Ramingining and neighbouring communities of Central Arnhem Land, in the Northern Territory. Artists who participated in its creation included David Malangi and George Milpurrurru.The work was created to coincide with the Australian Bicentenary and commemorates those Indigenous Australians who died as a result of European settlement. It was acquired by the National Gallery of Australia, where it is on permanent display. Its first exhibition was at the Sydney Biennale in 1988, and it was the centrepiece of an exhibition of Indigenous art at Russia's Hermitage Museum in 2000. As of 2014 it stands at the entry to the National Gallery's new wing that opened in September 2010. The Memorial was central to the 1988 Biennale of Sydney and remains on permanent display at the National Gallery of Australia in the main entrance hall.

In 1993, Mundine received the Medal of the Order of Australia  for service to the promotion and development of Aboriginal arts, crafts and culture.

In 1994 he co-curated (with Fiona Foley) I Shall never Become a Whiteman, for the Havana Biennale and Museum of Contemporary Art, Sydney. Tyerabowbarwarryaou was the first exhibition to exhibit contemporary Aboriginal art at the MCA. Tyerabarrbowaryaou aimed to present a new voice of Aboriginal culture. Mundine was a curator for 'Aratjara’ exhibition (Dusseldorf, London, and Denmark, 1993–94). In 1994 Mundine and Foley worked together to co-create the MCA Aboriginal Art: The Arnott's Collection exhibition. The exhibition was the first public display of the Arnott’s Biscuits Collection of Aboriginal Bark Paintings. The Arnott's Biscuits Collection of Aboriginal Bark Paintings comprises 275 bark paintings donated to the MCA in June 1993 by Arnott’s Biscuits Limited. The collection features works from the 1960s through to the early 1980s by important artists from the creative hubs in and around Groote Eylandt, Yirrkala, Galiwin’ku, Milingimbi, Maningrida, Ramingining, Gunbalanya, Wadeye and the Tiwi islands; places still significant today for their ongoing contribution to contemporary Aboriginal art practice. The collection is widely considered to be one of the most important collections of bark paintings in the world.

The Native Born (1996, MCA), is an exhibition and publication showing ceremonial and utilitarian weaving and artistic work from Ramingining community. This led to the inclusion of artists such as Robyn Djunginy in the 1998 Sydney Biennale. Other major exhibitions include They are Meditating: Bark Paintings from the Museum of Contemporary Art's Arnott Collection (2008).

In 2017 Mundine was the inaugural recipient of the Power Publications Award for Indigenous Art Writing for his essay "The Aboriginal Memorial: Australia’s Forgotten War", published in Artlink

Between 2005 and 2006 Mundine was resident at the National Museum of Ethnology (Minpaku) in Osaka, Japan as a Research Professor in the Department of Social Research.

In 2020 Mundine won the Australia Council's Red Ochre Award for Lifetime Achievement.

Mundine is currently an independent curator of contemporary First Nation art and cultural mentor for fellow First Nation artists.

Honours and awards
1993   Medal of the Order of Australia for service to the promotion and development of aboriginal arts, crafts and culture
2015   Level 2 winner, Indigenous Project or Keeping Place, for Bungaree’s Farm at Mosman Art Gallery, at the Australian Museums and Galleries Association MAGNA Awards  
2016   Best in Heritage Conference, Dubrovnik, showcased entry and finalist, Bungaree’s Farm 
2017   Power Publications Award for Indigenous Art Writing
2020   Red Ochre Award - Australia Council for the Arts

Exhibitions

Boards, committees and associations

Other roles 
 2020  Patron, King & Wood Mallesons Contemporary First Nation Art Award
 2018  Patron:  King & Wood Mallesons Contemporary First Nation Art Prize
 2018  Judge:  Woollahra Small Sculpture Award
 2007  Judge:  Telstra National Aboriginal & Torres Strait Islander Art Award
 2000  Judge: The Art of Place: The 5th National Indigenous Heritage Art Awards,  Australian Heritage Commission
 1993  Curator: Bayside Council First Nations Art Competition
 1988  Judge: Telstra National Aboriginal & Torres Strait Islander Art Award
 1985-87  Aboriginal Art Adviser, Artbank
 1996  Judge: Telstra National Aboriginal & Torres Strait Islander Art Award

References

External links
 
Red Ochre Award
Bungarees Farm - Mosman Art Gallery
Bungaree The First Australian 2012
Parliament of New South Wales Aboriginal Art Prize

Living people
People from New South Wales
Bundjalung people
Recipients of the Medal of the Order of Australia
1951 births